Saadat Saeed is a professor of Urdu language and literature at Government College University, Lahore and contemporary critic and poet of Urdu language.

Early life
Saadat Saeed was born at Lahore on 15 March 1949 as Saadat Hassan. His father A. D. Nasim was known in the various fields of Urdu language and literature.

Education
 In 1963, Saadat Saeed passed his matriculation from Board of Intermediate and Secondary Education, Lahore. After passing Intermediate from the same board in 1965 he got admission in University of the Punjab. He got his first degree with a roll of honour and scholarship in 1967. In 1969, Saadat Saeed stood first in M.A. Urdu and received a gold medal. In 1988 he completed his PhD from the same university.
 PhD	1988	Urdu Qasida	University of the Punjab Lahore.
 M.A.	1969	Urdu (with Gold Medal)First class First in Punjab	University of the Punjab Lahore.
 B.A.	1967	Urdu, philosophy, English
 Persian(Roll of Honour)	University of the Punjab Lahore.
 F.A	1965	English, philosophy, History. Persian	Board of Higher Secondary and Intermediate Lahore

Teaching career
In 1970, Saadat Saeed started his career as a lecturer from Govt. Islamia College, Lyallpur (Faisalabad). Three years after, he was transferred to Govt. Islamia College, (Railway Road) Lahore. He joined Government College, Lahore in 1986 as a lecturer. After some time, he was first promoted as Assistant Professor and then Associate Professor in 1995. He was transferred to Government College, Asghar Mall, Rawalpindi as Professor in 1999. After serving a few months there, he moved to Ankara University, Turkey as chairman Ankara Urdu Chair. In 2004, he returned to Pakistan and again joined GC University, Lahore as Professor.

Books
 Jayhat Numayee (Studies in Contemporary Short story) Published by Dastavez Matboaat Lahore. 1995
 Fun Aur Khaliq (Studies in Contemporary Poetry) Dastavez Matboaat Lahore.
 Iqbal aik Saqafti Tnazur Dastavez Matboaat Lahore.1998
 Kajli Bun (Poems) Published by Sang-e-Meel publication Lahore 1988.
 Adab Aur Nafi-e-Adab Dastavez Matboaat Lahore.1999
 Iqbal and The Sahiwal (Editor) Published by Iqbal Academy Lahore
 Ibn-e-Arabi Ka Nazria-e-Wahdat ul Wajood (Editor) Published by Iqbal-Shariati Foundation Lahore
 Chand Waqt Translation from Turkish poetry Maktba Al Farooq Wahdat Road Lahore 1998.
 Bansry Chup Hey Dastavez Matboat Urdu Bazar Lahore.
 Fanoon Asob Maktaba Alblag Urdu Bazar Lahore

Awards
Tamgha e Imtiaz

References 

Living people
Academic staff of the Government College University, Lahore
University of the Punjab alumni
1949 births